House with two rooms or Bing's house is a particular contractible, 2-dimensional  simplicial complex that is not collapsible. The name was given by R. H. Bing.

The house is made of 2-dimensional panels, and has two rooms. The upper room may be entered from the bottom face, while the lower room may be entered from the upper face. There are two small panels attached to the tunnels between the rooms, which make this simplicial complex contractible.

See also 

 Dogbone space
  Dunce hat
 List of topologies

External links
Bing's house with two rooms at Info Shako
A 3D model of Bing's house - the model can be visualized by using anaglyph glasses
A printable 3D model of Bing's house at Thingverse

References 

 
Low-dimensional topology